The Psychologist-Manager Journal (print ,  online )  is a quarterly peer-reviewed academic journal, founded in 1997 by the Society of Psychologists in Management. The journal is published by the American Psychological Association. It is conceptualized as a hybrid between a journal and a professional guide to good managerial practice and directed at the practicing psychologist-manager.

The journal has several areas to which manuscripts may be submitted. These areas include:

 Management Principles: The Theory of Management
 Live from the Firing Line: The Practice of Management 
 Research Tools for the Psychologist-Manager
 Book Reviews and Other Submissions

Special issues
The journal has published a number of articles on the integration of psychology and management. Some of the special issues have been:
 Clifton, D.O. (Ed.). Positive psychology and its implications for the psychologist–manager.
 Lowman, R.L. (Ed.) (1999) The psychologist-president.
 Lowman, R.L. (Ed.) The psychologist-entrepreneur.
 Koppes, L.L., & Swanberg, J. (Eds.) (2008). Work-Life effectiveness: implications for organizations.

Editors
The journal's founding editor was Rodney L. Lowman (Alliant International University), who edited the journal from 1997 to 2003. He was succeeded by Rosemary Hays-Thomas (University of West Florida), who served through 2007. The current editors are Elizabeth L. Blickensderfer, PhD and Elizabeth H. Lazzara, PhD.

Abstracting and indexing
The journal is abstracted and indexed in PsycINFO/Psychological Abstracts and within EBSCO databases.

References

External links
 

Publications established in 1997
Organizational psychology journals
Business and management journals
American Psychological Association academic journals